is a junction passenger railway station located in the city of Hidaka, Saitama, Japan, operated by the East Japan Railway Company (JR East).

Lines
Many Kawagoe Line trains from Kawagoe continue to Hachiōji. The station is also served by trains to and from  via the Chūō Line in the morning and evening peak periods.

Station layout
The station consists of one side platform and an island platform serving three tracks. Storage tracks are located on the east side of the station. The station has a "Midori no Madoguchi" staffed ticket office.

Platforms

History

The station opened on 15 April 1933. With the privatization of JNR on 1 April 1987, the station came under the control of JR East.

The Kawagoe Line from Kawagoe was electrified on 30 September 1985. The southern section of the Hachikō Line to and from Hachiōji was electrified on 16 March 1996, with through services commencing between Hachiōji and Kawagoe.

Passenger statistics
In fiscal 2019, the station was used by an average of 4483 passengers daily (boarding passengers only).

The passenger figures for previous years are as shown below.

Surrounding area
 Koma Shrine
 Josai University
Hidaka City Hall
Hidaka Post Office

See also
 List of railway stations in Japan

References

External links

 JR East station information 

Railway stations in Saitama Prefecture
Stations of East Japan Railway Company
Hachikō Line
Kawagoe Line
Railway stations in Japan opened in 1933
Hidaka, Saitama